William Aloysius Beckmann (December 8, 1907 – January 2, 1990) was a professional baseball pitcher. He pitched all or part of four seasons in Major League Baseball, from 1939 until 1942. He pitched mostly for the Philadelphia Athletics, but appeared in his last two major league games for the St. Louis Cardinals.

Prior to the minor leagues, he graduated from Washington University. Beckmann spent twelve years in the minor leagues before his MLB debut. His professional career began in 1927 with the Danville Veterans of the Illinois–Indiana–Iowa League. He remained in the minors until the Athletics selected him from the Atlanta Crackers in the rule 5 draft following the 1938 season. After the end of his MLB career, he pitched just one more season in the minors, playing for the Columbus Red Birds in 1943.

References

External links

Major League Baseball pitchers
Philadelphia Athletics players
St. Louis Cardinals players
Philadelphia Athletics scouts
Danville Veterans players
Scottdale Scotties players
Shawnee Robins players
Springfield Red Wings players
Houston Buffaloes players
Columbus Red Birds players
Knoxville Smokies players
Atlanta Crackers players
Rochester Red Wings players
Toronto Maple Leafs (International League) players
Washington University Bears baseball players
Baseball players from Missouri
1907 births
1990 deaths